Mae Wang National Park is located in Chom Thong District, Doi Lo District and Mae Wang District in Chiang Mai Province. The park covers four national reserved forests in Chiang Mai province: Mae Khan, Mae Wang, Chom Thong and Mae Chaem forests.

Topography
Doi Pha Tang is with 1,909 m the highest peak in the park. This part of the Thanon Thong Chai Range is the origin to tributaries of the Mae Chaem, Mae Wang and Mae Tuen rivers, which flow into the Ping River.

Climate
The park is generally cool all year round, average temperature is  throughout the year. Rainy season is from June to November, average rainfall is /year. Summer is from March to May.

History
A preliminary survey of the area was set up in June 2001.Later on 20 November 2009 Mae Wang National Park with an area of 74,766 rai ~  has been declared the 112th national park.

Flora
The park is home to the following forest types:
Evergreen forest include:

Deciduous forest include:

Dipterocarp forest include:

See also
List of national parks of Thailand
List of Protected Areas Regional Offices of Thailand

References

National parks of Thailand
Thanon Thong Chai Range
Tourist attractions in Chiang Mai province